Geniculate nucleus may refer to two structures in the brain:
 Lateral geniculate nucleus, in visual perception
 Medial geniculate nucleus, in hearing

See also
 Geniculate ganglion, of the facial nerve